This is a list of films shot in Seattle, Washington, United States.

Films

0–9
4 Minute Mile (2014)
21 and Over (2013)
50/50 (2011)
88 Minutes (2008)
99 and 44/100 Per Cent Dead (1974)
10 Things I Hate About You  (1999)

A
A Bit of Bad Luck (2014)
A Guy Thing (2003)
A Year in the Life (1986)
Act of Love (1980) (TV movie)
American Heart (1992)
An Officer and a Gentleman (1982)
The Architect (2015) directed by Jonathan Parker
Assassins (1995)

B
Bad Attitude (1983) (TV movie)
Bad Seed (2000) (a.k.a. Preston Tylk)
Barefoot in the Park (1982) (TV movie)
Battle in Seattle (2007)
Before and After (1970s) directed by Barbet Schroeder
Beta Test (2015)
Better Off Dead directed by Neema Barnette (1993)
Birthright (filmed 1988)
Black Circle Boys (1997)
Black Sheep (1996)
Black Widow (1987)
Bombs Away (1985)
The Book of Bob (filmed 2008)
The Book of Stars (1999)
Born to Be Wild (1995)
Boy Culture (2006)
Brand Upon the Brain! (2006)
Brush with Danger (2014)
Buffalo Bill's Defunct: Stories from the New West (2004)
Bullets, Blood & a Fistful of Ca$h (2006)
Bustin' Loose (1981)
Butterfly Dreaming (2008)

C
Calamari Union (2008) directed by Richard Lefebvre; remake of Finnish Calamari Union 
Captain Fantastic (2016) directed by Matt Ross
Catchfire (1990) developed as Back Track, disowned by director Dennis Hopper
The Changeling (1980)
Cinderella Liberty
Class of 1999 (1990)
Come See the Paradise (1990)
Coming Out of the Ice
The Cost of Living (2010)
Countdown (filmed 1996)
Crazy in Love (1992) (TV movie)
Crimes of the Past (2009) a.k.a. The Spy and the Sparrow
Cthulhu (2007)

D
The Danger of Love: The Carolyn Warmus Story (1992) (TV movie)
Daredreamer (1990)
Darkdrive (1997)
The Diary of Ellen Rimbauer (2003)
The Dark Horse (2008)
Dark Dungeons (2014)
Dark Mansions (1986) (TV movie)
Dear Lemon Lima (2009)
Death Note (2017 film) (2017)
Delivered (1999)
Desert Cathedral (2014)
The Details (2011)
Dichotomy (2010)
Disclosure (1994)
Divination (2011)
Dogfight (1991)

E
Eden (2012)
Eden (1996) directed by Goldberg Howard
Eleanor and Franklin (1976) (TV movie)
Endeavor (2014) directed by Robert Burke
Enough (2002)
Expiration Date (2006)

F
The Fabulous Baker Boys (1989)
Face of a Stranger (1991 TV movie) (based on Anne Perry novel)
Farewell to Harry (2002)
Fat Kid Rules the World (2012)
Fear (1996)
Fifty Shades Of Grey (2015)
Twin Peaks: Fire Walk with Me (1992)
Firewall (2006)
Frances (1982)
From Dusk till Dawn (1996)
Fifty Shades Darker (2017)

G
Georgia (1995)
Get Carter (2000)
Ghost Dad (1990)
Grassroots (2012)

H
The Hand that Rocks the Cradle (1992)
Harry and the Hendersons (1987)
Harry in Your Pocket (1973)
Highway (2002 film) (2002) (originally titled The Leonard Cohen Afterworld)
Hit!  (1973)
Homeland (2009)
House of Games (1987)
Humpday (2009)

I
The Immaculate Conception of Little Dizzle (2009)
Inheritance (2004) directed by Kris Kristensen
An Innocent Love (1982) (TV movie)
Into the Wild (2007)
It Happened at the World's Fair (1963)

J
Joyful Partaking (2002)
Joyride (1977)
Judas Kiss (2011)

K
Keep Your Day Job, Superstar (2009)
Kimi (2022)

L
Laggies (2014)
The Last Convertible (1979) miniseries based on Anton Olmstead Myrer's novel
The Last Mimzy (2007)
Late Autumn (2010)
Lethal Admirer (2018) (TV movie)
Life or Something Like It (2002)
Little Buddha (1993)
The Lives of Jenny Dolan (1975) (TV movie)
Living Life (2004)
Lost on the B Side (2006)
Love Happens (2009)
Lovers Lane (1999)
Lucky Them (2013)

M
Mad Love (1995)
The Magtaberg Affair (filmed 1988)
Manalive (2012)
Matt's Chance (2013)
McQ (1974)
Mine Games (2012)
Miss Shellagh's Miniskirt (2008)

N
The Naked Proof (2003)
The Night Strangler (1973) (TV movie)
North American (filmed 2008) directed by Robinson Devor
Nothing Against Life (2013)
Nothing Personal (Rolling Donut Productions, filmed 1988) 
Nutcracker: The Motion Picture (1986)

O
Outsourced (2006)
Oy Vey! My Son Is Gay!! (2009)

P
Pacific Aggression (2014)
Pandora's Clock (1996) a.k.a. Doomsday Virus
The Paper Tigers (2020)
The Parallax View (1974)
The Penitent Man (2010)
Penny Candy (filmed 2009)
Perfect 10 (2010) directed by Lindy Boustedt
Plain Clothes (1987)
Plaza Suite (1987) (TV adaptation with Carol Burnett)
Police Beat (2005)
Power (1986)
Practical Magic (1998)
The Prodigal (1983)
The Promise (2004)
Prefontaine (1997)

R
Radio Rebel (2012) (TV movie)
The Rape of Richard Beck (1985) (TV movie)
Reflections of Murder (1974) (TV movie)
Render Me Dead (2009)
Resident Butch (2009)
The Rich Man's Wife (1996)
The Right to Bear Arms (2010)
The Ring (2002)
The Ring Two (2005)
Rock Paper Scissors (2009)
Rogue Saints Movie (filmed 2010)
Rose Red (2002) (TV miniseries)

S
Safety Not Guaranteed (2012)
Say Anything... (1989)
Scorchy (1976)
The Search for Kennyboy (2012)
Secrets and Lies (directed by North By Northwest, filmed 2008)
Seven Hours to Judgement (1988)
Shredder Orpheus (1990)
Simon & Simon: In Trouble Again (1995) (TV movie, a.k.a. Precious Cargo)
Singles (1992)
The 6th Man (1997)
Slaves to the Underground (1997)
Sleepless in Seattle (1993)
The Slender Thread (1965)
Son of Terror (2008)
Stamp of a Killer (1987) (filmed as Dangerous Affections)
Starman (1984)
Sweet Revenge (1976)

T
Third Degree Burn (1989) (TV movie)
Threat of Innocence (1994) (TV movie)
Thursday's Child (1983) (TV movie)
To Cross the Rubicon (1991)
Touchy Feely (2013)
Traveling (2008)
Trouble in Mind (1985)
True Adolescents (2009)
Tugboat Annie (1933)
Twice in a Lifetime (1985)

U
Under Heaven (1998)
An Upstanding Citizen (filmed 1998)

V
The Vanishing (1993)

W
WarGames (1983)
Warwick (2016)
Waxie Moon in Fallen Jewel (2011) directed by Wes Hurley
We Go Way Back (2006)
We Tour Econo (2020)
Weather Girl (2009)
While You Weren't Looking (2012) (short)
The Whole Truth (2009)
With a Vengeance (1992) (TV movie)
World's Greatest Dad (2009)

Y
Yonder
You Came Along (1945)
You Can't Win
Young Joe, the Forgotten Kennedy (1977) (TV movie)

Z
Zoo (2007)

References

Notes

External links
Titles with locations including Seattle at the Internet Movie Database
Film location map – Seattle Office of Film and Music

Seattle
Films